Story of a Kiss is a 2002 Spanish drama film directed by José Luis Garci from a screenplay by Garci and Horacio Valcárcel. The film received seven Goya Award nominations, but did not win a single one.

Plot
The plot follows two different stories that take place decades apart from each other. Julio (Carlos Hipolito) attends the funeral of the uncle who raised him. After reminiscing with his uncle's friends, Julio remembers his childhood. At that time, his Uncle Blas (Alfredo Landa) fell in love with a much younger women who made him realize how dispassionate his life had become. The adult Julio also attempts to romance a fellow teacher.

Cast

Production 
The film is a Nickel Odeon Dos, Enrique Cerezo PC and PC 29 production. It had a reported budget of 500 million ₧.

Accolades 

|-
| rowspan = "7" align = "center" | 2003 || rowspan = "7" | 17th Goya Awards || Best Actress || Ana Fernández ||  || rowspan = "7" | 
|-
| Best Supporting Actor || Carlos Hipólito || 
|-
| Best Supporting Actress || Tina Sáinz || 
|-
| Best Cinematography || Raúl Pérez Cubero || 
|-
| Best Costume Design || Gumersindo Andrés || 
|-
| Best Production Supervision || Gil Parrondo || 
|-
| Best Makeup and Hairstyles || Paca Almenara, Alicia López, Antonio Panizza || 
|}

See also 
 List of Spanish films of 2002

References

External links
 

2002 films
Spanish drama films
2000s Spanish-language films
2000s Spanish films
2002 drama films
Films with screenplays by José Luis Garci
Films directed by José Luis Garci
Enrique Cerezo PC films